The Rail Safety Act 2006 is a law enacted by the Parliament of the State of Victoria, Australia, and is the prime statute regulating the safety of rail operations in Victoria. The Act was developed as part of the Transport Legislation Review conducted by the Department of Transport between 2004 and 2010 and is aimed at preventing deaths and injuries arising from rail operations.

The Act was the State's first dedicated statute on the subject and replaced provisions in the former Transport Act 1983. The Act forms part of the transport policy and legislation framework in Victoria set by the Transport Integration Act 2010, and its provisions are subject to the overarching transport system vision, transport system objectives and decision making principles set out in the Transport Integration Act. The Act was passed in early 2006 and commenced on 1 August of that year. The Act also established Victoria's first independent transport safety regulator, the Director, Public Transport Safety. In 2010 the statutory office of Director, Public Transport Safety was replaced by the Director, Transport Safety. Though functionally independent, the Director is part of the Department of Transport and reports to the relevant Ministers.

The responsible Minister for the Act is the Minister for Public Transport, currently Jacinta Allan.

Outline 
The stated purpose of the Act is "...to provide for safe rail operations in Victoria". The objects of the Act center on the safety of rail operations, management of safety risks, continuous improvement in rail safety management, public confidence in the safety of rail transport and appropriate stakeholder involvement. The Act also contains a number of overarching policy principles relating to shared responsibility, accountability for managing safety risks, integrated risk management, enforcement, transparency, consistency and stakeholder involvement.

The Act establishes a regulatory scheme with the following key elements:

 a number of performance based safety duties applying to a broad range of parties who can affect rail safety outcomes
 an accreditation scheme concentrating on key rail industry operational parties
 a requirement that rail operators have a safety management system in place
 a broad range of sanctions and penalties
 cost benefit protections against excessive action by the regulator against industry participants
 alcohol and drug controls on rail safety workers
 provision for the making of codes of practice to give guidance to regulated rail industry  parties.

The Act also established the State's first dedicated public transport safety regulator - the Director, Public Transport Safety - which was created as an independent statutory office.

Parts 

The Act is divided into ten parts:
 Preliminary
 Principles of Rail Safety
 Rail Safety Duties and Other Safety Requirements
 Protection and Control of Rail Operations
 Accreditation of Rail Infrastructure and Rolling Stock Operations
 Alcohol and Other Drug Controls for Rail Safety Workers
 Review of Decisions
 Codes of Practice
 General
 Other Amendments to Acts, Savings and Transitional

Coverage 
The Act regulates the safety compliance of most rail transport in Victoria including heavy and light rail systems, public and private sidings, tramways and tourist and heritage rail operations. The main railways regulated by the Act include the Melbourne heavy rail system, the Melbourne tram and light rail network, Victoria's regional standard and broad gauge rail networks and regional tourist and heritage railways. Railways excluded from coverage under the Act include railways in mines, amusement and theme park railways and slipways.

Duties 

Part 3 of the Act sets out a number of performance based safety duties which are required to be observed by designated rail industry participants including:

 rail infrastructure managers (including persons in charge of rail tracks)
 rolling stock operators
 rail contractors
 labour-hire entities
 rail safety workers.

"Rail contractor" is defined broadly by the Act to include a range of persons including those involved in design, construction, manufacture, supply, installation, maintenance, repair and modification who knows or ought reasonably to know that things were to be used as rail infrastructure or rolling stock.
 
The typical formulation of a safety duty specifies that persons in this category must ensure the safety of things for which they are responsible "so far as is reasonably practicable" although the formulation varies according to the party. Rail infrastructure managers and rolling stock operators, for example, are also required to provide or maintain systems of rail safety work that are, so far as is reasonably practicable, safe. Penalties for breach of the safety duties are substantial and vary among natural person and body corporate offenders.

The framework of safety duties in the Act seeks to give practical effect to the so-called "chain of responsibility" concept in the rail safety sector. That concept seeks to identify the parties who are in a sufficient position of control over risks, in this case to safety, and to allocate responsibility by law accordingly.

Accreditation scheme 
Two key parties responsible for the direct operation of railways in Victoria, rail infrastructure managers and rolling stock operators, are not permitted to operate under the Act unless they are granted accreditation by the regulator.  The purpose of accreditation is to attest to an operator's competence and capacity to manage the risks to safety associated with their rail operations. Matters applicants are required to demonstrate under the scheme are that their safety management system complies with the Act, that they have sufficient financial capacity or insurance to meet potential accident liabilities, and other matters.

Safety management systems 

Certain rail operators, that is infrastructure managers and rolling stock operators, are required to have a safety management system (SMS) to ensure the safe management of their rail operations. A safety management system must be documented and "...provide a comprehensive and integrated management system..." setting out all risks and control measures. In essence, the SMS is the key safety plan for those parties who have ground level operational responsibilities in the rail sector.

Compliance 
Compliance-related provisions to support the Rail Safety Act scheme were not included in that Act and instead were included in the then Transport Act 1983 (since renamed, the Transport (Compliance and Miscellaneous) Act 1983).  The compliance support scheme centres on provisions enabling the appointment of authorised officers, conferral of coercive powers and a range of administrative and court-based sanctions.  The key elements are:

 appointment of officers transport safety officers
 powers relating to entry to railway premises, inspection, securing sites, use of force and seizure of things
 powers to search, enter and require production of documents and information and to require name and address details
 sanctions and penalties such as improvement notices, prohibition notices and infringement notices
 powers to initiate prosecutions, receive safety undertakings and impose commercial benefits penalty orders, supervisory intervention orders, exclusion orders and adverse publicity orders.

Responsible regulator 
The Director, Transport Safety, who operates as Transport Safety Victoria, is the responsible regulator for the application and enforcement of the Act, and the regulation of safety performance of the rail sector in Victoria. The office was created by the Transport Integration Act 2010. It commenced on 1 July 2010 and subsumed the former office of the Director, Public Transport Safety within a broader transport safety office. The Director is part of  the Department of Transport, but is functionally independent of the Department and responsible Ministers, except in limited circumstances. The Director reports to the relevant Ministers.

Development

Regulatory scheme 
The development of the proposal for the Act was managed by the former Department of Infrastructure in Victoria as part of its Transport Legislation Review project. The Department released an issues paper outlining the broad policy outline for rail safety scheme legislation in May 2004. The paper outlined a series of concerns about the former rail safety regulation framework in Victoria including concerns about safety trends and outcomes and comparisons with schemes in overseas jurisdictions. Comments on the issues paper were requested from industry parties and other interested stakeholders. Comments received from industry, government and other stakeholders resulted in the refinement of the proposal and changes to its design.

Governance scheme 
The proposal for a new public transport regulator was developed separately but concurrently with the development of the rail safety regulatory scheme. The Department commissioned a further review which led to a detailed report on the subject. The review examined governance arrangements for safety regulation in the public transport sector drawing on Australian and overseas models. Recommendations were made aimed at improving the governance, accountability and methodology of the then public transport regulator which at that time obtained its powers to regulate safety through delegation from the Secretary of the Department of Infrastructure. Particular concerns were expressed about the lack of independence of the regulator function and the perceived lack of clarity about its charter and accountabilities as well as conflict of interest concerns. Ultimately, the review recommended the creation of an independent statutory office with a clearer charter and accountability arrangements.

The governance review also examined the case for merging the public transport regulator with the then Victorian marine safety regulator, the Director of Marine Safety. While not recommended at that time, the review found that integration of the functions could be examined in two to three years time once the public transport regulatory schemes had been settled and further examination of marine safety regulation had occurred.  The Victorian Government ultimately pursued the full integration of its public transport and marine safety regulators five years later as part of its Transport Integration Act proposal.

Ultimately, the proposals for both a new rail safety regulation scheme and new public transport safety governance arrangements were presented to the Victorian Parliament as proposed legislation in early October 2005.

Parliamentary approval

Introduction 
The Rail Safety Act was introduced into the lower house of the Victorian Parliament, the Victorian Legislative Assembly, as the Rail Safety Bill. The Bill was introduced at the same time as the Transport Legislation (Safety Investigations) Bill, a proposal to establish an independent public transport and marine safety investigator in Victoria, and the Bills were debated together.

The responsible Minister for both Bill proposals was the then Minister for Transport, Peter Batchelor. The Minister moved the second reading of the Rail Safety Bill on 6 October 2005 and set the context for the Bill in his speech in support as follows:

"This Bill heralds a new era in rail safety in Victoria. While Victoria has a proud rail safety record over the 150 years of rail operations in the State, new enhanced rail safety regulation and public transport governance is essential in order to maintain our current high safety levels and to generate continuous safety improvements in the future.

Government and transport operators must remain vigilant about rail safety performance. Together, we need to seek further safety improvements in an industry where, as international and interstate experiences show, incidents have the potential for serious consequences for life and limb. This is a particular issue for Victoria where the responsibility for the delivery and operation of passenger and freight rail services has been largely devolved to private operators and away from direct Government control.

Victoria's challenge, and more broadly the challenge for the nation, is to learn from the safety regulation improvements in other jurisdictions and industries and to adopt best practice regulation that facilitates better hazard identification and risk management -- activities aimed at preventing incidents, and at mitigating their consequences if ever they do occur. With these considerations in mind, it has been a key objective of the Government to develop a contemporary best practice rail safety regime for the State."

Debate, criticism and amendments 

The Rail Safety Bill was the subject of a reasoned amendment moved by the then Opposition shadow Transport Minister Terry Mulder on 1 March 2006 in the Legislative Assembly. The amendment sought to defer the Parliament's consideration of the Bill pending the approval of a national model Rail Safety Bill which had adopted the Victorian policy framework but which was being developed on a later timetable by the National Transport Commission. Mulder stated:

"The National Transport Commission has developed a model Bill for rail safety throughout Australia and is still in the process of consulting with industry groups and State Governments. Victoria has jumped the gun and decided to go it alone. As indicated in the second-reading speeches, the Government proposes to tidy up the legislation as it moves forward."

"In reality the rail industry is looking for and wants a single regulator. It wants simplification and regulations which are uniform across all States. As I have said, the Minister was not prepared to do that. I understand that the Victorian Government has agreed to follow several provisions of the model Bill. But there are other parts of the model Bill that the minister has not seen fit to follow. This has all the hallmarks of the Victorian Government trying to take the agenda away from the National Transport Commission, putting in place a process and trying to drive the agenda from that point forward."

In response, the Minister observed that:

(Members) have spoken on a landmark piece of legislation which sees Victoria leading and not following. We are leading the way in national rail safety reform. We are achieving objectives that many State Transport Ministers have been attempting to achieve along with their national colleagues. .... This is an important piece of legislation because the Rail Safety Bill will become the model legislation for all other Australian jurisdictions."

The Government moved a series of amendments to the Bill during the latter stages of its passage in the Legislative Assembly largely to give effect to national alignment matters agreed between the Department of Infrastructure and the National Transport Commission.

Passage, assent and commencement 
The Rail Safety Bill was passed by the Legislative Assembly on 1 March 2006 and was introduced into the Victorian Legislative Council on 2 March 2006.  Second reading was moved in the Council on 28 March and the Bill was ultimately passed without further amendment on 29 March 2006.

The Rail Safety Bill received Royal Assent on 4 April 2006 to become the Rail Safety Act 2006.  The Act was ultimately proclaimed to commence on 1 August 2006. The Rail Safety Regulations 2006 which were required to support the operation of the Act also operated from the same date thereby formally commencing the new rail safety regulation scheme.

Amendments to the Act 
The Act has been subject to some significant amendments since it was passed in 2006. These include requirements on rail infrastructure managers and road managers since 1 July 2010 to enter into "safety interface agreements". The scheme pursues the identification and management of risks to safety at road/rail crossings, particularly level crossings, as one means of improving safety outcomes at those locations.

National impact

2006 Model Bill 
The development and passage of the Rail Safety Act in Victoria in March 2006 was followed by policy and legislation developments at the national level. In June 2006, the Australian Transport Council approved a model Rail Safety Bill for adoption in law by the States and the Northern Territory. The regulatory framework in the national model Bill adopted the scheme set out in the Victorian Act.  Accordingly, the Victorian legislation satisfied the core national scheme requirements and required small changes only to be compatible with the national draft.

Adoption of the model national Bill was gradual. The national proposal was subsequently adopted by legislation in South Australia (in 2007), New South Wales (2008) and Tasmania (2009) and eventually in Western Australia (2010), the Northern Territory (2010) and Queensland (2010).

Once it was clear that a majority of other jurisdictions had implemented the new framework, the Victorian Rail Safety Act was amended to acknowledge that the Victorian statute forms part of the nationally consistent rail safety scheme

2008 centralisation proposal 
A further national proposal emerged in 2008 at the instigation of the Rudd Government. This followed soon after the approval of the national model Rail Safety Bill and before most States and the Northern Territory were able to embed the model Bill into their local laws.

The Australian Transport Council and the Council of Australian Governments are pursuing a centralisation proposal (sometimes called the "single national rail safety regulator") to establish a safety regulator for all rail operations in Australia including interstate railways and domestic state and territory urban systems (heavy rail, light rail and tram) and shortlines.  The proposal forms part of a "seamless national economy" proposal being pursued by the Commonwealth Government and COAG.

The proposal envisages the establishment of an applied laws scheme and a central rail safety regulation bureaucracy for Australia located in Adelaide in South Australia and the abolition of the current rail safety regulators in the States and the Northern Territory.

Negotiations are currently underway between the Commonwealth Government and States and Territories on this centralisation proposal. Final approval and adoption of legislation and other arrangements is still to occur. There has been both support for and opposition to the full centralised regulatory proposal since it was first raised.

Support 

The Overland is a passenger train between Melbourne, Victoria and Adelaide, South Australia. Operated by private company, Great Southern Rail, the train operates between the Melbourne terminal of Southern Cross, and Adelaide Parklands Terminal in Adelaide, and covers 828 kilometres between capitals.]. When in Victoria, the train operates under the Victorian Rail Safety Act and in South Australia under the companion South Australian Act of the same name. Coordinated regulatory activity is ensured by the regulators of each State and by the Rail Safety Regulators' Panel.

The original centralisation concept has been supported by interstate rail interests and jurisdictions such as Tasmania, Queensland, South Australia, the Commonwealth and the Northern Territory.  Those parties have argued that having separate rail safety regulators in each jurisdiction is inefficient and costly for the rail industry, particularly cross border operators, and also for Governments.

Supporters of the proposal have also asserted that Australia’s regulatory system for rail needs to be modernised to reflect a national approach to transport policy planning and to support the safe, efficient and sustainable growth of the railway industry.  It has also been suggested that the establishment of a national rail safety administration will "...deliver better rail safety outcomes for Australia, as it will draw on a national pool of knowledge and resources".

Advocates of the project have also suggested that the cost savings that might accrue as a result of more centralised rail safety laws and bureaucracy will result in better safety results because rail operators will use any monetary savings to improve their safety systems.

In addition, smaller jurisdictions generally see the rail safety regulation function as expensive and wish to shift costs to the Commonwealth Government.  Concerns have also been expressed about the progress of harmonisation across Australia, including since the approval of the national model Rail Safety Bill.

Criticism 

The centralised regulator proposal has been opposed at times by New South Wales, Victoria and the Western Australian rail safety regulator who have pointed to a lack of quantitative or qualitative evidence of impacts of the current jurisdiction-based national system on operator costs, particularly in light of the predominance of intrastate urban rail movements in Australia over interstate movements. These jurisdictions have also pointed to the good performance of rail safety regulation in Australia in recent years which has seen long-term trends point to reductions in deaths and injuries from rail operations. Agreement has already been reached to excise the Melbourne tram system from the national proposal; however Victoria and New South Wales in particular have indicated ongoing difficulties with ceding safety control over the large Melbourne and Sydney suburban rail systems to an entity located in Adelaide.

Some jurisdictions and stakeholders have contrasted the more decentralised regulatory position in other large rail federations, particularly the European Union and Canada, where countries and provinces retain strong local control of rail safety regulation and administration, especially in relation to urban and metro systems.  Some concerns raised in this context have reflected on the lack of subsidiarity consideration evident in the national proposal.

Concerns have also been expressed about the single mode aspect of the national centralisational proposal which would remove rail safety regulation from the New South Wales and Victorian regulators. Critics argue that the national proposal militates against the contemporary integrated transport directions evident in these larger jurisdictions in recent years. These directions have seen transport safety regulators becoming increasingly multi modal and covering modes such as rail, tram, bus and maritime in the one agency as a way of sharing safety expertise, reducing duplication and minimising opportunities for regulatory capture.  The national proposal would reverse this modern trend and create a single rail safety regulator.

Some stakeholders have criticised the safety credibility of the centralisation proposal, observing that the proposal is more directed at economic benefits rather than safety improvements and that, as a result, it has the potential to increase rail safety risks.
Several stakeholders have also raised the prospect of any new regulator becoming subject to regulatory capture.

Current directions 
The centralisation proposal remains unresolved although the current proposal suggests a start up date of 1 January 2013 for a new system which is still in evolution.  Recent developments suggest that a centralised regulator will be established to take over the rail safety regulation functions of a majority of jurisdictions but that the most populous jurisdictions such as New South Wales and Victoria and potentially other large rail States such as Queensland and Western Australia may retain a local regulatory presence under service level agreements.  Jurisdictions which choose to operate under service level agreements may do so through their existing regulators operating in conjunction with the Adelaide-based national regulation bureaucracy and under centrally determined policy and operational directions.

See also 

 Rail transport in Victoria
 Railways in Melbourne
 Trams in Melbourne
 Buses in Melbourne
 Transport Legislation Review
 Safety
 COAG
 Transport Integration Act
 Director, Transport Safety
 Chief Investigator, Transport Safety
 Tourist and Heritage Railways Act
 Transport Act 1983
 Transport (Compliance and Miscellaneous) Act 1983

References

External links 
 Department of Transport
 Transport Safety Victoria
 Australian Transport Council
 Council of Australian Governments

Victoria (Australia) legislation
Rail Safety Act
2006 in Australian law
2000s in Victoria (Australia)
History of rail transport in Australia
2006 in rail transport
Railway legislation